Eulithidium affine, common name the polka-dot pheasant or the spotted pheasant, is a species of sea snail, a marine gastropod mollusk in the family Phasianellidae.

Description
The height of the shell reaches 6.2 mm.
The elongate shell has a pointed ovate shape. It is thin, smooth, and shining. The spire is conic. It contains about 5 rather convex whorls, separated by well impressed sutures. The acute apex is rose colored. The oval aperture is oblique. The outer lip is thin and translucent. The columella has a white callus which is somewhat distended at the slightly impressed and grooved subperforate or imperforate umbilical region. The color of the shell is white, yellow or pale rose, more or less clouded longitudinally with rose, orange or brown, sometimes only with subsutural and peripheral series of short flammules, the entire surface closely and regularly punctate with pink or orange, and white.

Distribution
This species occurs in the Gulf of Mexico, the Caribbean Sea and the Lesser Antilles; in the Atlantic Ocean off Brazil.

References

 Robertson, R. 1958. The family Phasianellidae in the Western Atlantic. Johnsonia 3: 245–283.
 Turgeon, D.D., et al. 1998. Common and scientific names of aquatic invertebrates of the United States and Canada. American Fisheries Society Special Publication 26 page(s): 59
 Rosenberg, G., F. Moretzsohn, and E. F. García. 2009. Gastropoda (Mollusca) of the Gulf of Mexico, Pp. 579–699 in Felder, D.L. and D.K. Camp (eds.), Gulf of Mexico–Origins, Waters, and Biota. Biodiversity. Texas A&M Press, College Station, Texas

External links
 
 Gastropods.com: Eulithidium affinis affinis cruenta (f)

Phasianellidae
Gastropods described in 1850